Västerby is a locality situated in Hedemora Municipality, Dalarna County, Sweden with 368 inhabitants in 2010.

References 

Populated places in Dalarna County
Populated places in Hedemora Municipality